Bulletin de la Société Mathématique de France is a mathematics journal published quarterly by Société Mathématique de France.
Founded in 1873, the journal publishes articles on mathematics.
It publishes articles in French and English. The journal is indexed by Mathematical Reviews and Zentralblatt MATH.
Its 2009 MCQ was 0.58, and its 2009 impact factor was 0.400.

External links

Mathematics journals
Publications established in 1873
Multilingual journals
Société Mathématique de France academic journals
Quarterly journals